Victor Hugo Machado Maia Mesquita, commonly known as Vitinho, is a Brazilian footballer who plays as a midfielder for São Bernardo.

He has previously represented Tupi, Mogi Mirim, Botafogo-SP and Bragantino in various divisions of the Brazilian national leagues.

References

External links
 

Living people
1990 births
Brazilian footballers
Association football midfielders
Tupi Football Club players
Mogi Mirim Esporte Clube players
Oeste Futebol Clube players
Botafogo Futebol Clube (SP) players
Clube Atlético Bragantino players
Atlético Clube Goianiense players
Red Bull Bragantino players
Paraná Clube players
Esporte Clube Santo André players
Campeonato Brasileiro Série B players
Campeonato Brasileiro Série C players
Campeonato Brasileiro Série D players